Jaroslav Plašil (born 5 January 1982) is a Czech former professional footballer who played as a midfielder.

He spent most of his career in France with Monaco and Bordeaux, making 411 Ligue 1 appearances. He played 367 total times for the latter, and captained them to victory in the 2012–13 Coupe de France. He also played two seasons with Osasuna in Spain and one on loan to Catania in Italy.

Plašil earned 103 caps for the Czech Republic from 2004 to 2016. He represented them at four UEFA European Championships and the 2006 FIFA World Cup.

Club career

Early career
Plašil, aged 18, was signed by Monaco in 2000, but in his first two-year spell, he only started 8 matches. He was subsequently loaned to Ligue 2 club Créteil. After a decent performance, Plašil returned to Monaco at the start of the 2003 season and for the next four years he was a regular in the starting team and even enjoyed his finest moment in the 2003–04 season when the principality side reached the final of the UEFA Champions League. In that season, Plašil contributed a goal to Monaco's record-breaking 8–3 defeat of Deportivo La Coruña.

Osasuna
On 25 August 2007, Plašil signed a four-year deal at La Liga team CA Osasuna for a fee of €2.25 million, to replace the injured Javad Nekounam.

He made his debut on 16 September, replacing Javier García Portillo for the final 19 minutes of a goalless home draw against FC Barcelona. His first goal for the team from Pamplona came on 2 December, a left-foot volley to open a 2–1 victory at Deportivo de La Coruña. Three days later he got his first goal in the Reyno de Navarra Stadium, to begin a 1–1 draw against Sevilla FC. He finished the season with four goals from 35 games, the last being the only one in a win over rivals Real Zaragoza on 10 February 2008, in first-half added time.

On 5 October 2008, Plašil was sent off in the first half of a 1–0 home loss to Racing de Santander for handball from Ezequiel Garay's shot, although he missed the penalty kick. He again totalled four goals in 32 games, concluding on 31 May 2009 with an equaliser in a 2–1 home win over Real Madrid.

Bordeaux

On 9 June 2009, French champions Bordeaux signed Plašil on a four-year deal for an estimated €3 million. He made his debut for Bordeaux when they won the 2009 Trophée des Champions.

On 31 May 2013, Plašil captained Bordeaux in its 3–2 defeat of Evian in the 2013 Coupe de France Final at the Stade de France.

On 2 September 2013, Plašil signed on loan for Serie A club Catania. He played 29 times for the Sicilians, scoring on 29 September to open a 2–0 win over Chievo, their first win of the season.

On 7 June 2017, Plašil extended his contract for one more year. Six months later, he was one of three Girondins sent off in a 2–1 loss at fourth-tier US Granville in the last 64 of the cup; he received a five-match ban for dissent.

In July 2019, Plašil retired at the age of 37. He immediately joined the coaching staff at Bordeaux's reserve team in the Championnat National 3.

International career
Plašil made his debut for the Czech Republic on 31 March 2004, replacing Martin Jiránek for the final 21 minutes of a 2–1 friendly loss to the Republic of Ireland at Lansdowne Road. In his next game on 2 June he scored his first goal in a 3–1 friendly win over Bulgaria. He was selected for UEFA Euro 2004 in Portugal where his team reached the semi-finals; his lone appearance was a 2–1 win that eliminated neighbours Germany on 23 June at the Estádio José Alvalade. He started in what BBC Sport called an "under-strength" Czech team, making way for Karel Poborský with 20 minutes remaining.

He started all three of the Czechs' group games at the 2006 FIFA World Cup in Germany, their first since partition, where they were eliminated at the expense of eventual champions Italy. Plašil played 13 times in qualification for UEFA Euro 2008, scoring to cap a 3–0 win over Germany in the Allianz Arena on 17 October 2007 that qualified his team to the finals in Austria and Switzerland; it was Joachim Löw's first defeat as national manager. In the final tournament, Plašil started each game in Group A and scored to put the Czechs 2–0 up against Turkey in the last game, which they eventually lost 3–2 to be eliminated.

Plašil played every minute of the Czech Republic's campaign at UEFA Euro 2012 in Poland and Ukraine, where they were eliminated 1–0 by Portugal in the quarter-finals. He was called up for his fourth time at the continental championship when he was chosen for UEFA Euro 2016 in France. On 5 June in a pre-tournament friendly, he won his 100th cap in a 2–1 home friendly loss to South Korea. He started all three group matches at the tournament as the Czech national team exited with two losses and a draw.

Career statistics

Club

Notes

International

Scores and results list Czech Republic goal tally first, score column indicates score after each Plašil goal.

Honours
Monaco
UEFA Champions League runner-up: 2003–04

Bordeaux
Trophée des Champions: 2009
Coupe de France: 2012–13

See also
 List of footballers with 100 or more caps

References

External links

 
 
 
 

Living people
1982 births
People from Opočno
Czech footballers
Association football midfielders
Czech Republic international footballers
Czech Republic youth international footballers
Czech Republic under-21 international footballers
FIFA Century Club
UEFA Euro 2004 players
2006 FIFA World Cup players
UEFA Euro 2008 players
UEFA Euro 2012 players
UEFA Euro 2016 players
Czech First League players
Ligue 1 players
Ligue 2 players
La Liga players
Serie A players
FC Hradec Králové players
AS Monaco FC players
US Créteil-Lusitanos players
CA Osasuna players
FC Girondins de Bordeaux players
Catania S.S.D. players
Czech expatriate footballers
Czech expatriate sportspeople in Monaco
Expatriate footballers in Monaco
Czech expatriate sportspeople in France
Expatriate footballers in France
Czech expatriate sportspeople in Spain
Expatriate footballers in Spain
Czech expatriate sportspeople in Italy
Expatriate footballers in Italy
Sportspeople from the Hradec Králové Region